Nassarius protrusidens is a species of sea snail, a marine gastropod mollusc in the family Nassariidae, the nassa mud snails or dog whelks.

Description

Distribution
This species occurs in the Red Sea, in the Indian Ocean off La Réunion and in the Pacific Ocean off the Philippines.

References

 Cernohorsky W. O. (1984). Systematics of the family Nassariidae (Mollusca: Gastropoda). Bulletin of the Auckland Institute and Museum 14: 1–356.
 Vine, P. (1986). Red Sea Invertebrates. Immel Publishing, London. 224 pp

External links
 

Nassariidae
Gastropods described in 1918